Tunisia sent a delegation to compete at the 2008 Summer Paralympics in Beijing. The country was represented by 35 athletes (22 men and 13 women).

Medallists

Sports

Athletics

Men's track

Men's field

Women's track

Women's field

See also
2008 Summer Paralympics
Tunisia at the Paralympics
Tunisia at the 2008 Summer Olympics

References

External links
Beijing 2008 Paralympic Games Official Site
International Paralympic Committee

Nations at the 2008 Summer Paralympics
2008
Paralympics